This is an incomplete list of Statutory Instruments of the United Kingdom in 1959. This listing is the complete, 50 items, "Partial Dataset" as listed on www.legislation.gov.uk (as at March 2014).

Statutory Instruments

1-499
The Magistrates' Courts (Maintenance Orders Act, 1958) Rules 1959 SI 1959/3 (L. 1)
The Airways Corporations (General Staff, Pilots and Officers Pensions) (Amendment) Regulations, 1959 SI 1959/42
The Agriculture Act, 1958 (Appointed Day) (England and Wales) Order, 1959 SI 1959/80
The Reserve and Auxiliary Forces (Agricultural Tenants) Regulations 1959 SI 1959/84
The Copyright Act, 1956 (Transitional Extension) Order 1959 SI 1959/103
The Agriculture (Miscellaneous Time-Limits) Regulations 1959 SI 1959/171
The public Record Office (Fees) Order, 1959 SI 1959/181
The Superannuation (Polish Education Committee and Civil Services) Transfer Rules, 1959 SI 1959/191
The Milk and Dairies (General) Regulations, 1959 SI 1959/277
The Family Allowances, National Insurance and Industrial Injuries (European Interim Agreement) Order, 1959 SI 1959/292
The National Insurance (European Interim Agreement) Order, 1959 SI 1959/293
The Schools Regulations, 1959 SI 1959/364
The Handicapped Pupils and Special Schools Regulations, 1959 SI 1959/365
The Maintenance Orders (Facilities for Enforcement) Order, 1959 SI 1959/377
The Service Departments Registers Order, 1959 SI 1959/406
The Food Hygiene (Scotland) Regulations, 1959 SI 1959/413 (S. 16)
The Agriculture (Circular Saws) Regulations, 1959 SI 1959/427
The Food Standards (Ice-Cream) Regulations, 1959 SI 1959/472

500-1499
The Government Oil Pipe-Lines Regulations, 1959 SI 1959/715
The Government Oil Pipe-Lines (No. 2) Regulations, 1959 SI 1959/724
Military Pensions (Commonwealth Relations Office) Regulations, 1959 SI 1959/735
The Arsenic in Food Regulations, 1959 SI 1959/831
The Visiting Forces Act (Application to Colonies) (Amendment) Order, 1959 SI 1959/874
The Visiting Forces (Designation) (Colonies) (Amendment) Order, 1959 SI 1959/875
The Post-War Credit (Income Tax) Regulations 1959 SI 1959/876
The First-aid Boxes in Factories Order, 1959 SI 1959/906
The Opencast Coal (Concurrent Orders and Requisitions) Regulations, 1959 SI 1959/980
The Opencast Coal (Annual Value in Special Cases) Regulations, 1959 (LA) SI 1959/981
The Opencast Coal (Claims) Regulations, 1959 SI 1959/1146
The Coal Mines (Clearances in Transport Roads) Regulations, 1959 SI 1959/1217
Compensation (Occasional Use of Land for Defence Training purposes) (War Office) Regulations, 1959 SI 1959/1289
The Foreign Compensation (Roumania) (Registration) (Amendment) Order, 1959 SI 1959/1295
The Geneva Conventions Act (Colonial Territories) Order in Council, 1959 SI 1959/1301
The Evidence (New Zealand) Order 1959 SI 1959/1306
The Civil Aviation Act (Application to Crown Aircraft) Order, 1959 SI 1959/1309
The Diseases of Animals (Ascertainment of Compensation) Order, 1959 SI 1959/1335
The Governors' Pensions (Allocation) Rules, 1959 SI 1959/1347
The Manorial Documents Rules, 1959 SI 1959/1399

1500-2258
The Superannuation (Local Government, Social Workers and Health Education Staff) Interchange Rules, 1959 SI 1959/1573
The Direct Grant Schools Regulations, 1959 SI 1959/1832
The Superannuation (British Council and Civil Service) Transfer Rules, 1959 SI 1959/1922
The Superannuation (Imperial Institute and Civil Service) Transfer Rules, 1959 SI 1959/1923
The Tithe Redemption Commission (Transfer of Functions and Dissolution) Order, 1959 SI 1959/1971
The Visiting Forces Act (Application to Colonies) (Amendment No.2) Order, 1959 SI 1959/1979
The Superannuation (National Assistance Board) Transfer Rules, 1959 SI 1959/1985
The Motor Vehicles (Construction and Use) (Track Laying Vehicles) (Amendment) Regulations, 1959 SI 1959/2053
The Whaling Industry (Ship) (Amendment) Regulations, 1959 SI 1959/2054
The Agriculture (Lifting of Heavy Weights) Regulations, 1959 SI 1959/2120
The Merchant Shipping (Certificates of Competency as A.B.) (Canada) Order, 1959 SI 1959/2213
The Miscellaneous Mines (Explosives) Regulations, 1959 SI 1959/2258

Unreferenced Listings
The following 5 items were previously listed on this article, however are unreferenced on the authorities site, included here for a "no loss" approach.
asswater A Mine (Storage Battery Locomotives) Special Regulations 1959 SI 1959/37
asswater B Mine (Storage Battery Locomotives) Special Regulations 1959 SI 1959/38
Glass Houghton Mine (Shuttle Cars) Special Regulations 1959 SI 1959/663
Cambridge Waterworks Order 1959 SI 1959/1131
Gas Cylinders (Conveyance) Regulations 1959 SI 1959/1919

References

External links
Legislation.gov.uk delivered by the UK National Archive
UK SI's on legislation.gov.uk
UK Draft SI's on legislation.gov.uk

See also
List of Statutory Instruments of the United Kingdom

Lists of Statutory Instruments of the United Kingdom
Statutory Instruments